The Samuel Paty Square is a green space located in the 5th arrondissement of Paris next to the Sorbonne and the Musée de Cluny.

Location 
The garden is located at the address 2, Place Paul-Painlevé, in front of the Sorbonne, in the heart of the historic quarter of the Latin Quarter, Paris.

This site is serviced by the neighbouring Cluny–La Sorbonne Métro station on Line 10.

Origin of the name 
The garden takes its name after French teacher Samuel Paty, assassinated in a terrorist attack on 16 October 2020 in Conflans-Sainte-Honorine, a suburb of Paris. Paty was killed and beheaded by an Islamist.

Description 
This park is a symbolic place in the middle of the historic Parisian neighborough of schools and universities.

History 
The public garden was created in 1900 and originally called Square de la Sorbonne. It was renamed at the first anniversary of Paty's assassination.

See also 
 List of parks and gardens in Paris
 5th arrondissement of Paris
 Murder of Samuel Paty
 Sorbonne

References

Parks in France
Gardens in Paris
Monuments and memorials in Paris